Kenneth George Hill (born 7 March 1953) is an English former footballer who played professionally in England and the North American Soccer League.

In 1971, he joined  Gillingham, playing 125 league matches before leaving the team for the United States in 1974. That year, he signed with the Baltimore Comets of the North American Soccer League. He also played for the Washington Diplomats in 1977. He also played for Maidstone United, where he began his career, Lincoln City, with whom he made a single appearance in the Football League and Folkestone Town.

References

External links
 Ken Hill at nasljerseys.com

1953 births
Living people
Sportspeople from Canterbury
Footballers from Kent
English footballers
Association football defenders
Gillingham F.C. players
Lincoln City F.C. players
Maidstone United F.C. (1897) players
Folkestone F.C. players
England semi-pro international footballers
English Football League players
North American Soccer League (1968–1984) players
Baltimore Comets players
Washington Diplomats (NASL) players
English expatriate sportspeople in the United States
Expatriate soccer players in the United States
English expatriate footballers